Barbodes is a genus of small to medium-sized cyprinid fish native to tropical Asia. The majority of the species are from Southeast Asia. Many species are threatened and some from the Philippines (Lake Lanao) are already extinct. A survey carried out in 1992 only found three of the endemic Barbodes species, and only two (Barbodes lindog and B. tumba) were found in 2008. Several members of this genus were formerly included in Puntius.

Etymology
The name is derived from the Latin word barbus, meaning "barbel", and the Greek word oides, meaning "similar to".

Species
There are currently 48 recognized species in this genus, of which 15 are considered extinct and 2 considered possibly extinct:
 †Barbodes amarus Herre, 1924 (Pait)
 Barbodes aurotaeniatus (Tirant, 1885)
 Barbodes banksi (Herre, 1940)
 †Barbodes baoulan Herre, 1926 (Baolan)
 Barbodes binotatus (Valenciennes, 1842) (Spotted barb)
 Barbodes bovanicus (F. Day, 1877) (Bowany Barb)
 Barbodes bunau (Rachmatika, 2005)
 Barbodes cataractae (Fowler, 1934)
 †Barbodes clemensi Herre, 1924
 Barbodes colemani (Fowler, 1937)
 †Barbodes disa Herre, 1932
 Barbodes dorsimaculatus (C. G. E. Ahl, 1923) (Blackline barb)
 Barbodes dunckeri (C. G. E. Ahl, 1929) (Bigspot barb)
 Barbodes everetti (Boulenger, 1894) (Clown barb)
 †Barbodes flavifuscus Herre, 1924 (Katapa-tapa)
 Barbodes hemictenus D. S. Jordan & R. E. Richardson, 1908
 †Barbodes herrei (Fowler, 1934)
 Barbodes ivis (Seale, 1910)
 Barbodes joaquinae (C. E. Wood, 1968)
 †Barbodes katolo Herre, 1924
 Barbodes kuchingensis (Herre, 1940)
 †Barbodes lanaoensis Herre, 1924 (Kandar)
 Barbodes lateristriga (Valenciennes, 1842) (Spanner barb)
 Barbodes lindog Herre, 1924 (Lindog) (possibly extinct)
 †Barbodes manalak Herre, 1924 (Manalak)
 Barbodes manguaoensis (A. L. Day, 1914)
 Barbodes microps (Günther, 1868)
 Barbodes montanoi (Sauvage, 1881)
 †Barbodes pachycheilus (Herre, 1924)
 †Barbodes palaemophagus (Herre, 1924)
 †Barbodes palata Herre, 1924
 Barbodes palavanensis (Boulenger, 1895)
 Barbodes polylepis J. X. Chen & D. J. Li, 1988
 Barbodes quinquemaculatus (Seale & B. A. Bean, 1907)
 †Barbodes resimus (Herre, 1924)
 Barbodes rhombeus (Kottelat, 2000)
 Barbodes sellifer (Kottelat & K. K. P. Lim, 2021)
 Barbodes semifasciolatus (Günther, 1868) (Chinese barb)
 Barbodes semifasciolatus sachsii (Ahl, 1923) (Goldfinned barb) 
 Barbodes sirang Herre, 1932 (Sirang) (possibly extinct)
 Barbodes snyderi Ōshima, 1919
 †Barbodes tras Herre, 1926
 †Barbodes truncatulus (Herre, 1924) (Bitungu)
 Barbodes tumba Herre, 1924
 Barbodes umalii (C. E. Wood, 1968)
 Barbodes wynaadensis (F. Day, 1873)
 Barbodes xouthos (Kottelat & H. H. Tan, 2011)
 Barbodes zakariaismaili (Kottelat & K. K. P. Lim, 2021)

Note on species list:  Kottelat 2013 states that B. dorsimaculatus may not be referable to this genus and considers it to be species inquirenda.  He also implies that Barbodes should be restricted to Southeast Asian and Philippine endemics and that the following species from eastern and southern Asia may not be referable to this genus: B. bovanicus, B. carnaticus, B. elongatus, B. polylepis and B. wynaadensis.  Because these species fall outside of the geographic area of his paper, their position in Cyprinidae is not addressed.

References 

 
Cyprinidae genera
Taxa named by Pieter Bleeker